W. Ralph "Pest" Welch (January 13, 1907 – September 15, 1974) was an American football player and coach.  He served as the head coach at the University of Washington from 1942 to 1947, compiling a record of 27–20–3.  Welch led his 1943 Washington squad to the Rose Bowl, where they lost to USC, 29–0. He played college football at Purdue University as a halfback under head coach James Phelan, whom he followed to Washington as an assistant in 1930.

When Washington athletic director Ray Eckmann removed Phelan after the 1941 season, he selected Welch to replace him. Popular with the players, Welch wielded a reputation as a great scout of talent.  Eckmann retained Welch on a year-to-year basis with an initial $9,000 per season salary, matching Phelan's final salary.

Welch died on September 15, 1974, at University Hospital in Seattle, Washington.

Head coaching record

References

1907 births
1974 deaths
American football halfbacks
Purdue Boilermakers football players
Washington Huskies football coaches
All-American college football players
People from Sherman, Texas
Players of American football from Texas